Phoebe bicornis is a species of beetle in the family Cerambycidae. It was described by Olivier in 1795. It is known from Brazil and French Guiana.

References

Hemilophini
Beetles described in 1795